Nong Bok is a district (muang) of Khammouane province in mid-Laos.

References

Districts of Khammouane province